David John Mossman (born 27 July 1964) is an English former footballer who made 51 appearances in the Football League playing for Bradford City, Stockport County (in two spells) and Rochdale. He played as a winger. He began his career with hometown club Sheffield Wednesday, without playing first-team football for them, and went on to play in the Football Conference, for Lincoln City as they won the 1987–88 title, and for Boston United.

References

1964 births
Living people
Footballers from Sheffield
English footballers
Association football midfielders
Sheffield Wednesday F.C. players
Bradford City A.F.C. players
Stockport County F.C. players
Rochdale A.F.C. players
Lincoln City F.C. players
Boston United F.C. players
English Football League players
National League (English football) players